Game Prattana is a Thai television drama starring Teeradetch Metawarayut, Nuttanicha Dungwattanawanich.
The drama is set to air on January 26, 2022, every Wednesday and Thursday at 20:30 (8:30 pm) on Channel 3. The first trailer was released on January 5, 2022, and the second trailer was released on January 18, 2022, by Channel 3.

In addition, Game Prattana is the one among other dramas that Channel 3 made a coperate releasing with Viu, for the international viewers.

Synopsis 
Weerayawanich, the owner of Empire Group and Teerakitkarnkul , the owner of T Group, have been the rivals of consumer business for a long time. As a result, the heirs of both families, Milin and Anawin, affecting them being a rival since young. The both have a seesaw battle so far, until the day when they take the responsible of the families' business...the overcoming one another is the thing that they want.

Not just the rivalry of the two families, inside the Weerayawanich though, it always has a competition between them. The chair of CEO of the Empire Group is the thing that Milin aspired although she has to compete with her brother. The things went worse, when Phee, Milin's father, re-married to Wianna and transfer the post of CEO to her. That made Milin so angry and cut off the relationship with Phee. Moreover, the news is not just upset Milin but also shocked Anawin, because Wianna is his ex-girlfriend and she left her one year ago.

When the thing become like this, Milin and Anawin decided to cooperate with each other for establishing new company and do everything to make it big, for revenge Phee. They also announce at Phee's wedding, that they have become a couple. But when the time passed, the pretending to be a couple become real, because Milin has a crush on Anawin since childhood. While, Tewis has a secretly love to Milin and also Lisa, loves Anawin though. In addition, Phakin has concealed something for a lone time, the situation that Milin suspected and Phee seems to know it.
How the love life and the resentment of Milin and Anawin would end? When the business rivalry of both families lead everyone to bet with their dignity, the game that have to exchange, choose and spoof for the victory. The game that cause their hearts shaken with the fire of desire.

Cast and characters

Main 
 Teeradetch Metawarayut as Anawin Teerakitkarnkul / Win
The oldest child of Porama. He is warm and honest person. He lost his mother since young which make him become more taciturn. Moreover, he loves drawing and never thought to be the CEO of T Group. He is the ex-boyfriend of Wianna but he got dumped without being told any reason.

 Nuttanicha Dungwattanawanich as Milin Weerayawanich / Lin
The second child, the only daughter of Phee. She is velvet glove, likes to conquer and always thinks that she and Anawin are rivalry. Milin does everything for being CEO of Empire Group, but above all, she wants the acknowledgement from her father. In the past she used to be close with Phakin, but something happened to made everything changed and she also didn't know what is that incident. In addition, she believes that Wianna will come in to her family for scamming her father, so she would like to get rid of her.

 Yuranunt Pamornmontri as Phee Weerayawanich 
the father of Phakin, Milin and Pete and Empire Group'''s president. He is foxy and good at planning. Actually, he loves his family and his child but he expresses in the wrong way, so that make Milin lack of warmth from him.

  as Wianna Methamas (Read: Wi-an-na) / Anna
The woman who married to Phee with the mysterious reason. She is clever, quick-witted and knows when to beat and when to step back. She used to dump Anamin for some reason and that was related to the marriage with Phee.

  as Tewis Tiwawong / Peong
The former emplyee of T Group, but later changed the side to Empire Group''. Actually, he works for Phee with undisclosed reason, also he is quick-witted and crafty. He has a secret crush on Milin, so he does everything to separate Milin and Anawin.

  as Lisa Setsiri
Anawin's deft and excellent secretary. She is secretly loves Anawin so far, when Milin is back to Anawin's life, she try to separate them but it does not even work.

Supporting
  as Phakin Weerayawanich
Milin's older brother. He seems to more pliable than Milin and doesn't want the chair of CEO that much. In the past, it had some incident happened which made him and Milin didn't close to each other as before.

 Lita Kaliya Niehus as Jennis
The wife of Phakin who honestly loves him but her appearance seems unfriendly.

  as Naorn Teerakitkarnkul (Read: Na-orn) / Orn
The wounger sister of Anawin and the youngest child of Porama. She is optimistic and kind hearted.

  as Pete Weerayawanich
The youngest in Weerayawanich family. He is kind and soft person, and being the only one who doesn't has any resentment between the two families' businesses. But he is also affected from the parenting of Phee.

 Rapheephong Thapsuwan as Sean

  as Porama Teerakitkarnkul
The father of Anawin and Naorn. He looks kind outside but crafty, quick-witted and clever inside.

  as Amata
She is Phee's mother. She is family woman, decisive and does everything for the peace of her family.

 as Toto
  as Unging (Read: Ung-ing)
 Sukhapat Lohwacharin as Captain
  as Wasuthorn

Cameo 
 Wayne Falconer as Chart
  as Kaew
  as Boonliang
  as Madam Lee
  as Mister Lee
 Surasak Chaiaat as Jetsada
  as Nittaya
  as Weena
  as Onanong
  as Nim
  Wianna Methamas (young)
 Benjasiri Watthana as Grace
 Tantachj Tharinpirom as Judo

Original soundtracks

Reception

Thailand television ratings 
In the table below,  represents the lowest ratings and  represents the highest ratings.

 Based on the average audience share per episode.

References

External links 
 Ch3 Thailand Official Website
 Ch3 Thailand Official YouTube

Thai drama television series
Thai romance television series
Thai television soap operas
Channel 3 (Thailand) original programming
2022 Thai television series debuts
2022 Thai television series endings